The Denver Barbarians Rugby Football Club is a rugby union team based in Denver, Colorado. The Denver Barbarians have won 3 national championships dating back to their first DI title in 1990. The club's second title came in 1999, during the height of the Rugby Super League, defeating Belmont Shore RFC 22-18. The Barbarians recently won the 2018 DII National Championship, defeating the Detroit Tradesmen in an all-time thriller at Infinity Park, 39-38.

The Denver Barbarians are currently being represented on the USA 7s Eagles by Ben Pinkelman and Ke'Von Williams who have anchored the USA 7s team during the 2017–18 World Rugby Sevens Series.

Ben Pinkelman had an outstanding 2018-2019 year with the USA Eagles and was selected for the HSBC 7's Dream Team. Pinkelman was also selected into the USA Eagles' 2019 Rugby World Cup squad. Pinkelman played in 3 of the 4 pool matches, coming off the bench as an openside flanker.

Denver Barbarian Eagles

15s Players
Matt Alexander 1998, 1997, 1996, 1995
Andre Bachelet 1998, 1997, 1996, 1995, 1994, 1993
Andre Blom 2000, 1999, 1998
Barry Daily 1991, 1990, 1989
Mike DeJong 1991, 1990
Juan Grobler 2002, 2001, 2000, 1999, 1998
Russ Isaacs 1989
Rob Lumkong 1998, 1997, 1996, 1994
Tyson Meek 2006
Jone Naqica 2003, 2002, 2001
Fred Paoli 1991, 1989, 1987, 1986, 1985, 1983
Ben Pinkelman 2019
Doug Rowe 2005
Dough Straehley 1984, 1983
Mark Vandermolen 1987
Link Wilfley 2003, 2002, 2001, 2000
Toby Robson 1999
Samuel Saldi 2003, 2004
Joseph Saldi III 2002, 2003
Erik Flink 2005, 2004, 2003, 2002

7s Players
Andre Bachelet 1997, 1996, 1994, 1993
Doug Brown 1999
Mike Coyner 2004, 1999, 1998
Riaan Hamilton 2003
Steve Laporta 1991, 1990, 1989, 1988
Bob Lockrem 2002
Rob Lumkong 1994
Cody Melphy 2018
Ben Pinkleman 2016, 2018, 2018 (C), 2019 (HSBC 7's Dream team selection)
Dave Poquette 1990, 1989, 1988
Jone Naqica 2005, 2004, 2003, 2002
Doug Rowe 2003
Ke'Von Williams 2017, 2018, 2019
Kevin Whitcher 2006, 2005,2004, 2002, 2001
Tyson Meek

See also
 Denver Stampede

References

External links
 

Sports teams in Denver
Rugby union teams in Colorado
1967 establishments in Colorado
Rugby clubs established in 1967